The United States House of Representatives elections in California, 1900 was an election for California's delegation to the United States House of Representatives, which occurred as part of the general election of the House of Representatives on November 6, 1900. California's seven-seat delegation remained all-Republican.

Overview

Results

District 1

District 2

District 3

District 4

District 5

District 6

District 7

See also  
57th United States Congress
Political party strength in California
Political party strength in U.S. states
United States House of Representatives elections, 1900

References  
California Elections Page 
Office of the Clerk of the House of Representatives

External links  
California Legislative District Maps (1911-Present) 
RAND California Election Returns: District Definitions
 

1900
California
United States House of Representatives